Night Drive is a 2022 Indian Malayalam-language crime thriller film directed by Vysakh, starring Indrajith Sukumaran, Anna Ben,Roshan Mathew and Siddique. The film is written by Abhilash Pillai. The movie depicts the story of a young couple and how they land in trouble when they meet with an accident. The film was released on 11 March 2022.

Premise
The plot is about a young couple who are out on a drive where they meet with an accident. It leaves them in a triangle between a cop who investigates the accident and the corrupt political hegemony who are in pursuit of them.

Cast 

Indrajith Sukumaran as CI Benny Moopan
Anna Ben as Riya Roy
Roshan Mathew as Georgy 
Siddique as Minister Rajan Kurup
Kalabhavan Shajon as DYSP Chacko Cherian
Alexander Prasanth as Francis/Pranchi
Sreevidya Mullachery as Ammini Ayyappan/Ayyappan
Santhosh Keezhattoor as CPO Pappan
Kailash as Balu Krishna (Rajan Kurup's P.A)
Surabhi Santosh as Amina (Balu's wife)
Srikant Murali as Dr. Firoz
Sudheer Karamana as Jaleel (Rajan Kurup's P.A)
Sohan Seenulal as Santhosh (Rajan Kurup's P.A)
Muthumani as City Police Commissioner Sharanya Varma IPS
Renji Panicker as Roy (Riya's Father) (Cameo appearance)
Shaju Sreedhar as Anil Nair (Channel Head)
Della George as Reporter

Songs 
Ranjin Raj is the music director of the film. The film has only a single song titled "Paathi Paathi Parayathe" sung by Kapil Kapilan and Nithya Maammen. Murukan Kattakada is the lyricist of the song.

Release and reception
The film was first scheduled to be released in March 2021 but was postponed due to COVID-19 pandemic. The film was theatrically released on 11 March 2022.

V Vinod Nair of The Times of India gave  wrote that "If you are looking for a good thriller to kick off your weekend, Night Drive is the film for you". A critic from Behindwoods wrote that it "is watchable but highly predictable thriller for the weekend". The Indian Express opined that "The whole narrative style feels outdated and the sudden heroism thrust upon Roshan shows how filmmakers like Vysakh cannot come out of the formulaic thought process". A critic from OTT Play stated that "Though Night Drive starts off as an atypical Vysakh thriller and eventually veers towards the director's familiar territory, the refreshing casting choices do the film a world of good in making it entertaining".

References

External links
 
 
 
 
 
 

2022 films
2022 thriller films
Indian thriller films
2020s Malayalam-language films